Pierre-Yvon Lenoir (8 August 1936 – 25 November 2015) was a French middle distance runner who competed in the 1960 Summer Olympics.

References

External links
 

1936 births
2015 deaths
French male middle-distance runners
Olympic athletes of France
Athletes (track and field) at the 1960 Summer Olympics
Mediterranean Games gold medalists for France
Mediterranean Games medalists in athletics
Athletes (track and field) at the 1959 Mediterranean Games